Atlantic Canadian English is a class of Canadian English dialects spoken in Atlantic Canada that is notably distinct from Standard Canadian English. It is composed of Maritime English (or Maritimer English) and Newfoundland English. It was mostly influenced by British and Irish English, Irish and Scottish Gaelic, and some Acadian French. Atlantic Canada is the easternmost region of Canada, comprising four provinces located on the Atlantic coast: Newfoundland and Labrador, plus the three Maritime provinces of Nova Scotia, New Brunswick, and Prince Edward Island. Regions such as Miramichi and Cape Breton have a wide variety of phrases and words not spoken outside of their respective regions.

History 
Canadian English owes its very existence to important historical events, especially the Treaty of Paris of 1763. English was first spoken in Canada in the 17th century in seasonal fishing communities along the Atlantic coast, including the island of Newfoundland, and at fur trade posts around Hudson Bay. Treated as a marker of upper-class prestige in the 19th century and the early part of the 20th, Canadian dainty was marked by the use of some features of British English pronunciation, resulting in an accent similar to the Trans-Atlantic accent known in the United States. Students in school were not permitted to use Gaelic, upon threat of punishment for not using the King's English, and thus Gaelic fell into disuse. The Canadian dainty accent faded in prominence after World War II, when it became stigmatized as pretentious, and is now almost never heard in contemporary Canadian life outside of archival recordings used in film, television, or radio documentaries.

Phonology
In all Atlantic Canadian English,  (the "short a sound") is raised before nasal consonants. The merger, typical of Standard Canadian English as well, is not typical of the rest of Atlantic Canadian English, however. Nova Scotia's Halifax English and New Brunswick's Saint John English show  raising before a few consonants, somewhat reminiscent of a New York accent, but nowhere near as defined (bad has a different vowel sound than bat and back), though Charles Boberg suspects that to be an older recessive feature. Nova Scotia's Lunenburg English may show non-rhotic behaviour, and Nova Scotia English generally has a conservatively-back  compared with other Canadian English dialects.

Certain Atlantic Canadian English dialects have been recognized by both popular and scholarly publications for distinctly sounding like Irish English dialects. Newfoundland English further shows the cheer–chair merger, the line–loin merger, and a distinct lack of the marry–merry merger.

The varied but similar Maritimer accents are influenced by an overwhelming majority of early Scottish and Irish immigration namely in the regions of Saint John, Miramichi, Cape Breton and parts of Halifax.

Maritimes
In addition to the above, the English of the Maritime Provinces (New Brunswick, Nova Scotia, and Prince Edward Island) has some unique phonological features:
 Like most other Canadian English, Maritimer English usually contains Canadian raising though to a less extreme degree than the rest of the country. Also, both variants of  can have notably rounded realizations.
 A merger of coach and couch is possible because of the raised variant of  being rounded.
 A devoiced and retracted  is traditionally common.

Lexicon
That sense may be influenced by Yorkshire dialect "reight" , which means "very, rather, or considerably." 

Ingressive speech exists; "yeah" and "no" are spoken by people while they inhale (colloquial pronunciation). That is often referred to as a "Gaelic gasp."

Prince Edward Islanders use more British terms more often than any other Maritimers because of the overwhelming homogeneity of the province's Scottish and Irish ethnicity.

See also 
 Canadian English
 Languages of Canada
 Newfoundland English
 The Maritimes
 Acadian French
 Acadians

References

 

Canadian English
Acadian culture
Culture of Atlantic Canada
English
English language in Canada